The Colorado Women's Hall of Fame is a non-profit, volunteer organization that recognizes women who have contributed to the history of the U.S. state of Colorado. As of 2020, 170 women have been inducted.

History
There was a short-lived recognition program established in Colorado in 1965 to honor the contributions of women to the state, known as the Colorado Women of Achievement awards. Each year, three honorees from throughout the state who had distinguished themselves in their profession or avocation were recognized at an annual banquet held in Denver, given a cash award, and received a pin with the emblem of the program, which was sponsored by the Columbia Savings and Loan Association. The 1965 inductees, honored in 1966, included Verona Burkhard, Jo Eleanor Elliott and Sister Frances Marie Walsh. In 1967 the inductees for the 1966 award were Sabina O’Malley, Elizabeth McAulliffe Calabrese, and Genevieve Fiore. In 1968, the honorees for 1967 were recognized. They included Rena Mary Taylor, Marion M. Maresh, Mrs. E. Ray Campbell. Two Life Award recipients, honoring a life-long commitment of service, were given to Mary M. McDonald and Ella Matty Orman. 1968 inductees, recognized in 1969 were Anna M. Garnett, Betty Pellet,  Margaret Rossi, with Ruby Lewis Neal being recognized with the Life Award.

Almost two decades later, a new recognition program began. The Hall of Fame organization was founded and incorporated as a non-profit organization in 1984 to recognize women's contributions to the territory and state of Colorado and to provide role-models for young girls and women. Serving on the board also offers leadership opportunities for women. Discussed conceptually in February 1984, it was organized by June of the same year.  M.L. Hanson sat as the president on the board until 1997.

Criteria
The criteria for induction into the Colorado Women's Hall of Fame is that women have "significant ties to Colorado and during their lifetimes:
 Made significant and enduring contributions to their fields of endeavor
 Elevated the status of women
 Helped open new frontiers for women and for society in general
 Inspired others by their example"

Inductees
Up to 10 inductees are admitted to the Hall of Fame every evenly numbered year.

Notes

Footnotes

Citations

References

Further reading

External links
Colorado Women's Hall of Fame home page
Colorado Virtual Library home page

Lists of American women
Women's halls of fame
Halls of fame in Colorado
History of women in Colorado
Lists of people from Colorado